The women's rhythmic group 6 clubs + 2 hoops gymnastic event at the 2015 Pan American Games was held on July 20 at the Toronto Coliseum.

Schedule 
All times are Eastern Daylight Time (UTC-4).

Results

References 

Gymnastics at the 2015 Pan American Games
2015 in women's gymnastics